Pirates, privateers, corsairs, and buccaneers were active in the Bay of Honduras from the 1540s to the 1860s. This is an annotated, chronological list of such events, with sortable tables provided.

Prelude

1500s
1502
 30 July14 August: Christopher Columbus reconnoitres the southern coast of the Bay, this being the first arrival of non-Amerindians to the region.

1508
 start of Julyend of December: Juan Díaz de Solís and Vicente Yáñez Pinzón, with Pedro de Ledesma, reconnoitre the mouth of the Bay.

1510s
sine datum
 s.d.s.d.: Cuban slaving expeditions to the Bay Islands.

1518
 13 November13 November: Diego Velázquez de Cuéllar named adelantado of Yucatan, encompassing the northern half of the Bay.

1520s
1524
 start of Januaryend of June: Gil González Dávila founds the first Hispanic settlement in the Bay, Puerto de Caballos,  and further leads a campaign against Manche Ch'ol settlements on the Dulce River, bringing the Spanish conquest of Honduras to the Bay.
 3 May3 May: Cristóbal de Olid founds Triunfo de la Cruz.

1525
 18 May18 May: Francisco de las Casas relocates Triunfo de la Cruz and christens it Truxillo.

1526
 8 December8 December: Francisco de Montejo named adelantado of Yucatan.

1528
 start of Julyend of December: Francisco de Montejo, with Alonso González Dávila, leads a campaign against Chetumal, bringing the Spanish conquest of Yucatan to the Bay, and further (partially) reconnoitres the northern coast of the Bay.

1530s
1532
 start of Julyend of (following) June: Alonso González Dávila (fully) reconnoitres the northern coast of the Bay.

1537
 8 December8 December: Alonso de Cáceres founds Comayagua.

1540s
sine datum
 s.d.s.d.: Marcos de Ayala Trujeque pioneers the Spanish logwood trade, which possibly reaches Bacalar shortly thereafter.

1544
 start of Januaryend of June: 1543–1544 Pachecos entrada brings the northern half of the Bay under Spanish rule.

1546
 s.d.s.d.: Royal Navy established.
 start of Octoberend of (following) June: Pedro de Ávila, under commission by Francisco de Montejo, surveys the Bay.

1550s
1550
 s.d.s.d.: Spanish begin construction of Fort Santa Barbara.

16th century

1540s
1544
 start of Novemberend of December: Twenty-two French corsairs aboard a patax, Pedro Braques captain, cruise the Bay, but are apprehended.

1550s
1558
 s.d.s.d. of 1560: French corsairs raid Truxillo thrice, Puerto Caballos once, and a nearby settlement called Monguiche once.
 start of Marchend of June: Two-hundred French corsairs, aboard two ships, raid Puerto Caballos.

1560s
1561
 s.d.s.d.: French corsairs raid Puerto Caballos and Truxillo.

1570s
1571
 start of Januarymid-April: Chuetot, with 50 men aboard a ship from Honfleut, cruises the Bay.

1572
 13 January13 January: Lutheran pirates or privateers, aboard three ships and a chalupa, raid Puerto Caballos.

1573
 23 February22 March: Francis Drake, with 17 men aboard the Minion, or John Oxenham aboard the Bear, cruise the Bay (and land at Guanaxa) during their Caribbean expedition.

1575
 9 May9 May: French corsairs, aboard two zabras, raid Puerto Caballos and Truxillo.

1576
 start of Julyend of December: Andrew Barker, with William Coxe, Philip Roche, and 70 men aboard the Ragged Staffe and Beare, raids Truxillo, but is eventually repulsed.

1577
 start of Octoberend of April of 1578: An English pirate or privateer (called Francisco de Acles by the Spanish), with 60 men aboard two ships, cruise the Bay, further sacking Puerto Caballos and Bacalar.

1578
 mid-Februarymid-March: William Coxe, with 35 men, cruises the Bay.

1580s
1580
 start of Mayend of May: French corsairs or English pirates or privateers (possibly) cruise the northern half of the Bay (off the Yucatan peninsula).

1590s
1592
 9 Mayend of June: Christopher Newport, with 200 men aboard the Golden Dragon, Prudence, Margaret, and Virgin, raids Truxillo and Puerto de Caballos.

1593
 start of Marchend of December: The Count of Cumberland, with some 125 men aboard the Anthony and the Discovery, attempts to raid Puerto de Caballos, but is shortly repulsed.

1594
 start of Januaryend of June: Christopher Newport and John Burg attempt to raid Puerto de Caballos, but are shortly repulsed, whereupon Newport cruises the Bay with John Middleton.
 15 May15 May: William Parker and Jérémie Raymond, with four ships, two frigates, and three pinnaces, raid Puerto de Caballos or Truxillo.

1595
 s.d.s.d.: English pirates or privateers, in consort with French corsairs, capture Truxillo.
 s.d.s.d.: An English pirate or privateer, in consort with a French corsair (the former called Rocharte, the latter Jeremías, by the Spanish), attempt to raid Puerto de Caballos, but upon failing, raid settlements in the Golfo Dulce, and thereafter water in Utila, where they are repulsed.
 start of Mayend of May: William Parker, aboard one ship, three consorts, and two pinnaces, (again) raids Puerto de Caballos, further cruising the Golfo Dulce, and thereafter rendezvousing with Benjamin Wood and Wentworth [captains under Robert Dudley] at Guanaxa, whereupon they all raid and occupy Truxillo.
 start of Julyend of July: Jérémie Raymond, with three ships, a pinnace, and a galliot, raids and burns Puerto de Caballos, further cruising the Golfo Dulce, and thereafter retiring to Utila, where the crew are surprised by a Spanish force out of Truxillo.

1597
 30 March15 April: Anthony Sherley and William Parker raid Truxillo, Puerto Caballos, and riverine settlements on the Dulce River.

17th century

1600s
1601
 s.d.s.d.: Pirates or privateers aboard four vessels (possibly) cruise the Bay (off the Yucatan peninsula).

1602
 s.d.s.d.: Dutch privateer-turned-buccaneer, Bleeveldt or Blauvelt, settles near Bluefields.

1603
 16 February7 March: Christopher Newport, with Michael Geare, captures Puerto de Caballos.

1604
 7 Marchend of following year: Spanish vecinos settle Santo Tomas de Castilla.

1606
 s.d.s.d.: Six English pirates or privateers, aboard a frigate, raid Puerto Caballos, and march towards an inland settlement called Xequexa, were they are apprehended.
 start of Januaryend of June: Dutch privateers harass Spanish galleons at Santo Tomas de Castilla, and further attempt to raid the settlement, but are repulsed.

1607
 s.d.s.d.: Dutch privateers or pirates raid Santo Tomas de Castilla and Puerto de Caballos.

1610s
1610
 s.d.s.d.: Dutch privateers or pirates raid Puerto de Caballos.

1613
 s.d.s.d.: English, Dutch or French privateers or pirates raid Truxillo.

1616
 s.d.s.d.: English privateer or buccaneer, Quinn, seeks to plant settlement in Providence Island.

1617
 s.d.s.d.: English privateers raid Bacalar.

1620s
1621
 3 June3 June: The Dutch West India Company is chartered.

1630s
sine datum
 s.d.s.d.: Spanish residents of the Bay begin illicitly trading with Dutch and English ships at port.
 s.d.s.d.: English, Dutch, or French buccaneers or pirates begin abducting Amerindian residents of the Bay for sale at non-Spanish slave markets.

1630
 s.d.s.d.: English, Dutch, or French privateers or pirates raid and burn Truxillo.
 s.d.s.d.: Anthony Hilton settles Tortuga.
 4 December4 December: The Providence Island colony is chartered.

1631
 s.d.s.d.: Providence Island colony's charter is expanded to encompass the Bay.

1632
 s.d.s.d.: English, Dutch, or French privateers or pirates raid Truxillo.

1633
 s.d.s.d.: Anthony Hilton and Abraham Chamberlain pioneer the English dye-wood trade in Tortuga.
 26 April18 September: Jan Janszoon van Hoorn, under commission from the West India Company, with Diego el Mulato and Cornelis Jol, raids Truxillo.

1634
 start of Februarythird quarter of following year: English or Dutch privateers or buccaneers cruise the Bay.

1635
 27 December29 January in following year: Providence Island colony granted letters of reprisal against the Spanish.

1636
 22 January22 January: Armada de Barlovento established.
 start of Marchend of May: Providence Island colony commissions privateers William Rous, John Leicester, Cornelius Billinger, Giles Mersh, and William Woodcock, instructing them (among other things) to impress Spanish pilots, including those familiar with the Bay.
 start of Aprilmid-May: English or Dutch privateer or buccaneer, Nacre or Neckere, leads 60 English and 100 Miskitu men on an (unsuccessful) march on Truxillo, and thereafter cruises the Bay on a frigate with 25 to 30 men.
 mid-Mayend of May: Yucatan forbids the storing of logwood on beaches.

1637
 start of Septemberend of September: Thomas Newman cruises the Bay aboard a ship and two small craft.

1638
 s.d.s.d.: Tipu spur widespread revolt against Bacalar, their efforts being possibly aided by piratical raids, and the Peten Itza kingdom.
 s.d.s.d.: Peter Wallace founds the first English settlement in the Bay, Barcadares.
 s.d.s.d.: English or Dutch privateers or buccaneers raid Mayan settlements on Bennett's Lagoon (near Bacalar).
 mid-Marchend of June: Diego el Mulato cruises the Bay.
 start of Mayend of May: English or Dutch privateers or buccaneers, aboard two ships and five frigates, cruise the Bay.
 8 June8 June: Proprietors of the Providence Island colony grant William Claiborne letters patent to settle Roatan.

1639
 10 February10 February: Diego el Mulato, aboard two ships, raids and scorches an Amerindian settlement on Guanaxa.
 start of Mayend of September: Nathaniel Butler, with William Jackson, 200 English men and an unknown number of Miskitu allies, aboard two ships, under commission of the Providence Island colony, attempts unsuccessful raid of Truxillo.
 start of Septembermid-September: English or Dutch privateers or buccaneers, with Alonso Gaitan and Amerindian allies from Guanaxa, raid and scorch an Amerindian settlement on Roatan.
 mid-December3 January of following year: English or Dutch privateers or buccaneers, aboard four ships, cruise the Bay.

1640s
sine datum
 s.d.s.d.: English buccaneers or Baymen settle Roatan.

1640
 start of Marchend of March: English or Dutch privateers or buccaneers, aboard eight craft, raid and assault Truxillo and a number of Amerindian settlements on Lake Izabal and Utila.

1641
 s.d.s.d.: Dutch privateers or buccaneers, with Diego Canche, raid Mayan settlements near the Belize or Sittee River, and interrupt a Franciscan misión by Bartolomé de Fuensalida.
 s.d.s.d.: Diego el Mulato raids and scorches Truxillo, and further ventures inland to abduct women.

1642
 start of Marchend of April: Diego el Mulato attempts to raid Amerindian settlements on the Ulua River, but upon failing to do so, raids Puerto de Caballos.
 22 November22 November: Diego el Mulato, with 70 men, raids Bacalar and nearby Mayan settlements (north of the Monkey River).

1643
 20 Julymid-September: William Jackson, with William Rous, Samuel Axe, and a certain Cromwell, with 1,200 recruits from Barbados and St. Kitt's, aboard three ships and three pinnaces, raids and holds Truxillo twice, and raids Santo Tomas de Castilla once.

1644
 s.d.s.d.: English or Dutch pirates raid settlements in the Amatique Bay and the Bay Islands.
 s.d.s.d.: Spanish begin construction of Castle of San Felipe de Lara.

1645
 s.d.s.d.: English or Dutch pirates, with 1,600 men aboard sixteen ships, raid Truxillo.

1646
 s.d.s.d.: English or Dutch pirates raid settlements in Guanaxa.

1648
 s.d.s.d.: English or Dutch pirates raid Truxillo.
 start of Juneend of June: English or Dutch privateer or buccaneer, Abraham, raids Bacalar.

1650s
sine datum
 s.d.s.d.: English buccaneers-turned-Baymen start logging logwood in the Bay.
 s.d.s.d.: Miskitu mercenaries, possibly or likely with Baymen and Shoremen, begin enslaving Amerindian and Hispanic residents of the Bay.

1650
 mid-Julyend of July: Spanish oust English buccaneers-turned-settlers from Roatan.

1652
 29 May29 May: English or Dutch privateer or buccaneer, Abraham, (again) raids Bacalar.
 start of Novemberend of November: English or Dutch privateers or buccaneers raid Mayan settlements on the New River.

1654
 23 October23 October: English or Dutch privateers or buccaneers interrupt a Bacalar entrada by Francisco Pérez near the Belize River.

1659
 s.d.s.d.: English or Dutch privateers or buccaneers impress or enslave a number of residents of Mayan settlements near Bacalar.

1660s
sine datum
 s.d.s.d.: English buccaneers or Baymen raid Bacalar-in-Pacha.

1660
 s.d.s.d.: François l'Olonnais raids Truxillo.

1662
 11 December11 December: The Council of Jamaica resolve to carry on trade with Spaniards in the Bay (among others), by force of arms if necessary.

1665
 s.d.s.d.: The Armada de Barlovento is reformed.
 19 March29 June: John Morris, David Martien, Henry Morgan, Jacob Fackman, and a certain Freeman cruise the Bay, and further raid Truxillo and a number of Spanish or Amerindian coastal settlements in the Bay.

1667
 start of Juneend of June of following year: François l'Olonnais, with Mozes van Klijn, harasses Spanish shipping in the Bay, sacks Puerto de Caballos, and further attempts raids of nearby Spanish settlements.

1670s
1672
 s.d.s.d.: English, French, or Dutch pirates, privateers or buccaneers raid Truxillo and nearby Esparza.
 22 June22 June: English logging in Spanish dominions (including the Bay) is deemed piracy by real cédula.

1676
 s.d.s.d.: French pirates, privateers or buccaneers raid Truxillo.

1677
 start of Augustend of August: Bartholomew Sharpe interrupts a Franciscan misión by Joseph Delgado, and further possibly raids a number of Mayan settlements near the Belize River.

1678
 s.d.s.d.: English, French, or Dutch pirates, privateers or buccaneers raid Truxillo and nearby Verapaz.

1679
 26 September26 September: John Coxon captures a Spanish merchant vessel laden with indigo, possibly in the Bay.

1680s
1680
 mid-Julyend of August: Pedro de Castro, with Juan Corso and Giorgio Nicolo, surprises English shipping in the Bay.

1682
 start of Januaryend of May: Jean Hamlin surprises English shipping in the Bay.

1683
 17 May16 June: Laurens de Graaf, Michiel Andrieszoon, Nicholas van Hoorn, Michel de Grammont, Jacob Hall, and Jean Toccard cruise the Bay.
 start of Decemberend of December: Dutch pirates or privateers raid Spanish settlements on Lake Izabal.

1684
 27 April5 May: Dutch pirates or privateers raid Spanish settlements on Lake Izabal.

1685
 start of Januaryend of September: Laurens de Graaf and Michel de Grammont, with Jan Willems, Michiel Andrieszoon, George Bannister, and Pierre Bot, cruise the Bay.

1686
 s.d.s.d.: English, Dutch, or French pirates, privateers or buccaneers raid or attack Spanish settlements on Lake Izabal.
 start of Marchend of March: Laurens de Graaf raids Spanish or Mayan settlements in the Bay of Ascension, after which they cruise the Bay.

1687
 s.d.s.d.: English, Dutch, or French pirates, privateers or buccaneers raid or attack Bodegas del Golfo, Olancho, and Santo Tomas de Castilla.

1688
 start of Februaryend of February: Jan Willems and Jacob Evertson surprise Spanish shipping in the Bay.

1690s
1690
 s.d.s.d.: English, Dutch, or French pirates raid Spanish or Amerindian settlements in the Bay of Amatique.

1694
 16 Novemberend of February following: Spanish privateers surprise English shipping near the Belize River.

18th century

1700s
1705
 start of Novemberend of November: Archibaldo Magdonel de Narión and Francisco Joseph Jiménez, with 30 men aboard two goletas, cruise the Chetumal Bay.

1707
 start of Januaryend of September: English buccaneers-turned-Baymen raid or attack Tipu.

1710s
1718
 start of Februarymid-March: Blackbeard, with about 180 English and 70 Afro-Caribbean men, aboard the Queen Ann's Revenge and two Spanish prizes, waters at Coxen Hole, and surprises merchant captain William Wade aboard the William and Mary.
 1 April9 April: Blackbeard, with Stede Bonnet, Lieutenant Richards, and Israel Hands, aboard the Queen Ann's Revenge and the sloop Revenge, surprises merchant captains David Harriot, Wyar, and James, aboard a ship and five sloops, near the Turneffe Atoll.
 16 December23 December: Charles Vane, with Robert Deal, surprises English shipping in the Bay.

1720s
1721
 start of Januarymid-April: Vernon of Jamaica, captain of a merchant ship, arrests Charles Vane, possibly within the Bay.

1722
 10 Januaryend of February: George Lowther, with John Walkers and 80 to 90 men, aboard a ship and a sloop, surprises English shipping near the Belize River.
 start of Augustend of August: Thomas Anstis, with John Fenn aboard the Morning Star, surprises merchant captain Dursey near the Belize River.
 start of Augustmid-February of following year: Esteban de la Barca, with 50 men aboard two periaguas, surprises an English merchant frigate near the Belize River.

1723
 start of Marchend of March: Fifty to sixty Spanish privateers, aboard one vessel, surprise English shipping near the Belize River, but are afterwards massacred by Edward Low and George Lowther, with Nicholas Lewis and about 50 men.

1724
 start of Marchend of March: Francis Spriggs, with about 40 men aboard the Bachelor's Delight, surprises merchant captains Samuel Pick Jr. (of Rhode Island), Dixxe Gross, William Wood, Thomas Morris, Simon Fulmore, James Nelley, and Hackins (of London) near Guanaxa.
 start of Mayend of May: Spanish privateers surprise English shipping in the Bay.
 23 December23 December: Francis Spriggs and Richard Shipton, with Nicholas Simmons, Jonathan Barlow, 10 English and three or four Afro-Caribbean men, aboard one periagua, surprise merchant captains Glen, Matthew Perry, and Ebenezer Kent in the Bay.

1725
 start of Februaryend of February: Francis Spriggs surprises English shipping in the Bay.
 25 March5 April: Juan Antonio Díaz de la Rabia, with 90 men aboard a frigate, cruises near the Belize River, but is seized by HMS Diamond (Timothy Bridge lieutenant).

1727
 start of Januaryend of January: Baymen, with about 100 Miskitu allies aboard several small craft, raid Chunhuhub, Tela, and Tihosuco in the Bay of Ascension.
 start of Marchend of June: Spanish re-settle Bacalar as a military post.
 25 May25 May: Spanish privateers aboard two periaguas surprise merchant captain Rickets in the Bay.

1728
 start of Novemberend of November: Spanish privateers surprise English shipping in the Bay.

1729
 s.d.s.d.: Spanish begin construction of Fort San Felipe at Bacalar.
 s.d.s.d.: English, French, or Dutch privateers or pirates raid Puerto de Caballos.
 start of Februaryend of February: Spanish privateers surprise English shipping in the Bay.

1730s
1730
 start of Februaryend of February: Spanish privateers surprise English shipping near the Belize River, but are repulsed by merchant captain Burrows and Baymen.

1731
 start of Januaryend of January: Eighty Spanish privateers, aboard a guardacostas, surprise merchant captain John Young (of New York) in the Bay.
 24 March24 March: Pedro Polis, with 60 men aboard a guardacostas, surprises the John and Jane (Ed. Burt captain, about 30 men and some women onboard) near the Turneffe Atoll, but is eventually repulsed.
 28 June28 June: Twenty-five Spanish privateers, aboard a sloop, surprise merchant captain Roger Groves (of New York), with 30 to 40 men, in the Bay.
 start of Augustend of August: Spanish privateers, aboard a periagua, surprise English shipping in the Bay.

1732
 start of Januaryend of February: Seventy Spanish privateers, aboard a brigantine, surprise merchant captain Farrington (of Boston) in the Bay.
 start of Mayend of May: Spanish privateers surprise a merchant captain Wickham in the Bay.
 start of Augustend of August: Spanish privateers surprise a merchant captain Knox in the Bay.
 start of Decemberend of January of following year: Spanish privateers, with 330 to 340 men aboard a galley and two sloops, surprise merchant captains Hindman, Bradin, and Dutch in the Bay.

1733
 10 March10 March: Spanish privateers surprise English shipping in the Bay.
 start of Decemberend of January of following year: Spanish privateers surprise merchant captain Underwood (of Boston) in the Bay.

1734
 start of Septemberend of September: Spanish privateers surprise merchant captain William Downs in the Bay.
 28 September11 October: Spanish privateers, with 120 men aboard two sloops and five periaguas, surprise merchant captains Ephraim Higgins, Richard Dursey (of Rhode Island), and Edmonds (of Boston) in the Bay, but are shortly repulsed.
 start of Novemberend of November: Spanish privateers surprise a Dutch merchant fly boat in the Bay.

1735
 start of Octoberend of October: Spanish privateers, aboard two periaguas, surprise merchant captains Bond (of Boston), Smith (of Jamaica), Wickham (of Rhode Island), Pitman (of Rhode Island), and Cranston (of Rhode Island) in the Bay.

1736
 start of Marchend of March: Spanish privateers, del Petro Polla and Philip Ackling, engage merchant captains Woodberry, Willis (of Jamaica), and John Davis in the Bay.
 1 July22 November: Spanish privateers surprise English shipping in the Bay.

1737
 19 January19 January: Spanish privateers surprise English shipping near the Belize River.
 26 April26 April: Spanish privateers, with 500 to 600 men aboard a man of war, a galley, and five periaguas, surprise merchant captains Ralph Harle, John Ray, Blackadore, Hall, and Bennet near the Belize River.
 mid-Augustend of September: Spanish privateers surprise merchant captains John Thomas Woner, Maxey Drowse, and John Busley in the Bay.

1738
 18 January18 January: Thirty Spanish privateers, aboard two or three periaguas, surprise merchant captain Ames Wadland near the Turneffe Atoll.
 start of Aprilend of April: Spanish privateers, aboard three large periaguas, surprise a merchant sloop in the Bay.
 start of Julyend of July: Spanish privateers surprise merchant captain Edward Buckley in the Bay, but are shortly repulsed.
 12 August12 August: Eighteen Spanish privateers, aboard a sloop, surprise merchant captain Stephen Bastwick in the Bay, but are shortly repulsed.

1739 
 15 January15 January: Spanish privateers aboard a sloop surprise merchant captains Mark Anderson, John Guyn, and Zacariah Williams in the Bay.
 1 February2 March: Spanish privateers surprise merchant captain Gwynn (of Boston) in the Bay.
 start of Marchend of March: Spanish privateers surprise merchant captains Collis (of Rhode Island), Joseph Williams, Wiliam Barbour, Cobb, and Burges near Turneffe, but are shortly repulsed.
 start of Aprilend of April: Spanish privateers aboard a sloop surprise merchant captain Mark Anderson in the Bay.
 start of Mayend of May: Spanish privateers, aboard two men of war and a half-galley, surprise English shipping in the Bay.
 start of Septemberend of September: Spanish privateers surprise merchant captain White in the Bay.
 start of Octoberend of October: Twenty Spanish privateers, aboard two periaguas surprise merchant captains Pustle and Gowan in the Bay.
 start of Octoberend of February of following year: Holiday, with 75 men aboard a sloop, under commission from Jamaica, cruises against Spanish privateers in the Bay.

1740s
1740
 start of Januarymid-April: A Jamaican privateer, with merchant captains Wilson and Gowan, seizes a Spanish privateer in the Bay.
 start of Aprilend of April: Spanish privateers surprise merchant captain Sears in the Bay.
 start of Aprilend of April: Spanish privateers, aboard two craft, surprise the John and Jane in the Bay, but are eventually repulsed by merchant captains Vincent (of Boston), Thatcher, and a number of Baymen aboard a small sloop.
 start of Juneend of August: Spanish privateers surprise merchant captains Dunham, Montgomery, and Flowers in the Bay

1741
 start of Februaryend of February: Spanish privateers, with 110 men aboard two periaguas, surprise merchant captain Burchell in the Bay.
 start of Aprilend of May: Spanish privateers aboard two periaguas surprise merchant captains Bursley, Bunker, Johnston, Davis, Taylor, and Card in the Bay.
 start of Juneend of June: Spanish privateers surprise merchant captain John Wise in the Bay.
 start of Decemberend of April of following year: Spanish privateers surprise merchant captains Snow, Smith, Mason, and Humphreys in the Bay.

1742
 1 January2 July: Ball of Boston surprises a Spanish privateer cruising in the Bay.
 start of Julyend of August: Spanish privateers surprise merchant captains Charles Davidson and Coffin in the Bay.

1744
 start of Marchend of March: Spanish privateers, aboard one vessel, surprise merchant captains Fiske, Bell, and Richardson in the Bay.

1746
 start of Januaryend of January: Spanish privateers surprise English shipping near the Turneffe Atoll.
 start of Februaryend of March: Spanish privateers, aboard a periagua, surprise merchant captain Small in the Bay.

1747
 start of Mayend of June: Spanish privateers, aboard two craft, surprise English shipping off the Belize River.
 start of Decemberend of February of following year: Spanish privateers, aboard two craft, surprise a merchant schooner in the Bay.

1748
 start of Januaryend of January: Felipe López de la Flor, under commission from Yucatan, raids and scorches Barcadares and the Baymen's logging camps on the Belize River.
 start of Julyend of July: Felipe López de la Flor (again) raids and scorches the Baymen's settlement and camps on the Belize River, but is eventually repulsed.
 start of Augustend of September: Spanish privateers surprise English shipping in the Bay.

1750s
1750
 1 January3 August: Spanish privateers surprise English shipping in the Bay.
 6 May6 May: Spanish privateers, with 123 men aboard a galley, surprise merchant captains Vervel, Hysham, Kattur, and Brigs on the New River, but are shortly repulsed.
 17 September17 September: Spanish privateers, aboard two half-galleys, surprise merchant captains Lilly and Riven in the Bay, but are shortly repulsed.

1751
 s.d.s.d.: Spanish settle Omoa as a military post, and (eventually) begin construction of Fortaleza de San Fernando.
 25 December27 December: Spanish privateers, aboard two galleys and a brig, surprise English shipping near the Belize River and Water Caye, but are shortly repulsed by merchant captains Henry Stevenson, Troup, and others.

1752
 13 February13 February: Spanish privateers surprise merchant captain Newgar on the Belize River.
 start of Juneend of June: Spanish privateers surprise merchant captains Devereux, Maudsley, Couzens, Mosely, and Rand in the Bay, but are eventually repulsed by William Pitt, Mosely, McNamara, 50 Baymen, and 70 Shoremen.
 start of Augustend of August: Spanish privateers, aboard several craft or periaguas, surprise merchant captains James Man and John Lance in the Chetumal Bay.
 2 August28 September: Spanish privateers, aboard six periaguas and a flat (later joined by captain Palmo with 76 men aboard a dorey and two periaguas), surprise merchant captains Crowel (of New York) and Hall (of Connecticut), who are later joined by captains Arnold and Hill, near Water Caye.
 start of Octoberend of October: Spanish privateers, aboard a guardacostas, surprise English shipping in the Bay, but are shortly repulsed.
 start of Decemberend of December: Spanish privateers, aboard two brigs, surprise English shipping in the Bay.
 start of Decemberend of February of next year: Spanish privateers surprise merchant captains Philip Hotton of Connecticut and James Ward of Pennsylvania in the Bay.
 4 December4 December: Spanish privateers surprise English shipping in the Bay, but are shortly repulsed.

1753
 start of Januaryend of January: Spanish privateers surprise merchant captains Telamon Phoenix, Conaway, and Spurrier in the Bay.
 start of Januaryend of January: Antonio Alexis, aboard a brig, surprises merchant captains Coverly, Conolly, Green, Lord, and Menzie in the Bay.
 24 February24 February: Spanish privateers surprise English shipping in the Bay, but are shortly repulsed.
 28 February28 February: Spanish privateers, aboard a guardacostas, surprise merchant captain Clark in the Bay, but are shortly repulsed.
 start of Mayend of May: Spanish privateers, aboard a brig, surprise merchant captain Ed. Menzies near Caye Bokell, but are shortly repulsed.
 24 May24 May: Sergeant of Rhode Island, with merchant captains Lawrence, Brown, Dickson, and a number of Baymen, capture and burn a Spanish privateer.
 start of Julyend of July: Spanish privateers surprise merchant captain Dunscomb near Turneffe.
 12 September12 September: Spanish privateers, with 170 men aboard a galley, surprise merchant captains Burger, French, and Menzie near Turneffe.

1754
 start of Aprilend of April: Spanish privateers surprise merchant captain Man near Glover's Reef.
 23 May23 May: Spanish privateers surprise merchant captains Lawrence, Brown, and Dickson near Water Caye.

1755
 14 May14 May: Baymen request and are granted a detachment of twenty British Army soldiers for their defence.

1756
 start of Mayend of May: Spanish privateers, aboard a guardacostas, surprise merchant captain Ebbets in the Bay.

1770s
1770
 start of Julyend of July: Spanish privateers surprise English shipping in the Bay.

1771
 start of Juneend of July: Certain pirates are apprehended by the Baymen.

1772
 start of Marchend of March: Spanish privateers surprise two merchant vessels in the Bay.
 6 March6 March: Spanish privateers, aboard two guardacostas, surprise merchant captain Thermin near Glover's Reef.

1773
 start of Marchend of July: Spanish privateers surprise English shipping in the Bay.

1775
 start of Januaryend of February: Spanish privateers, aboard a guardacostas, surprise merchant captains Ward of South Carolina and Stamer near Glover's Reef.

1777
 12 September12 September: Hezekiah Anthony captures the settlement on St. George's Caye, which is shortly ransomed by the Baymen, whereafter Anthony seizes English shipping in the Sibun River.

1790s
1796
 start of Novemberend of December: Spanish privateers surprise English shipping in the Bay.

1797
 start of Juneend of June: English frigate, possibly of or with Baymen, raids Truxillo.

19th century
1800s
1804
 start of Januaryend of January: French privateers, aboard one vessel, surprise merchant captains Hurry and Hills near Turneffe.
 1 July10 July: Spanish privateers surprise merchant captain Jonathan Card near Utila.

1805

1806

1810s
1818
 start of Decemberend of October of following year: Pirate Mitchell cruises near the Belize River.

1819
 10 May10 May: Louis-Michel Aury, with Gordon, raids or attacks Spanish settlements on Lake Izabal.

1820s
1822
 2 November22 November: Francis Valpy, with 20 men aboard a schooner, raids a Baymen's settlement on Calabash Caye, and seizes a merchant brig near Glover's Reef.

1823

1824
 31 March31 March: Pirates surprise a merchant schooner (Jeykill owner) in the Bay, and further massacre the crew.

1850s
1858
 26 December26 December: American filibusters aboard the Susan are wrecked off Glover's Reef, whereupon the Superintendent of colonial Belize (forcibly) removes them to Mobile, Alabama, aboard .

1859
 1 June17 June: Spanish privateers surprise merchant captain Gunn'' near Roatan.

1860s
1860
 7 September17 September:  captures William Walker and a number of American filibusters, whereupon the Superintendent of colonial Belize turns them over to the (Hispanic) Honduran authorities at Truxillo.

Tables

16th century

17th century

18th century

19th century

Notes and references

Explanatory footnotes

Short citations

References

News

Journals

Theses

Print 

 
 
 
 
 
 
 
 
 
 
 
 
 
 
 
 
 
 
 
 
 
 
 
 
 
 
 
 
 
 
 
 
 
 
 
 
 
 
 
 
 
 
 
 
 
 
 
 
 
 
 
 
 
 
 
 
 
 
 
 
 
 
 
 
 
 
 
 
 
 
 
 
 
 
 
 
 
 
 
 
 
 
 

Piracy in the Caribbean
Pirates
 
History of Belize
17th-century pirates
18th-century pirates
Caribbean pirates
English pirates
Piracy by year
Piracy lists
Piracy
Piracy